Dr. John Waddell was the former President of Allen University, Columbia, South Carolina. He is an American academic, and the former President of Saint Paul's College, Lawrenceville, Virginia and Paul Quinn College, Dallas, Texas. He is currently the President of Denmark Technical College, Denmark, South Carolina.  Waddell attended the University of South Carolina for his Bachelor's degree. He received his Master's degree from USC, and his Doctorate from Florida State University in 1992.

References

External links
 Waddell's bio on FSU Website
 Waddell on Paul Quinn Website
 Department of Education on Waddell

Living people
University of South Carolina alumni
Florida State University alumni
Allen University faculty
Year of birth missing (living people)